The 2018–19 Sam Houston State Bearkats men's basketball team represent Sam Houston State University during the 2018–19 NCAA Division I men's basketball season. The Bearkats are led by ninth-year head coach Jason Hooten and play their home games at the Bernard Johnson Coliseum in Huntsville, Texas as members of the Southland Conference. They finished the season 21-12, 16-2 in Southland play to finish in 1st place. As the No. 1 seed in the Southland tournament, they lost to New Orleans in the semifinals. They received an automatic bid to the NIT where they lost in the first round to TCU.

Previous season
The Bearkats finished the 2017–18 season 21–15, 12–6 in Southland play to finish in fourth place. They defeated New Orleans in the quarterfinals of the Southland tournament before losing in the semifinals to Southeastern Louisiana. They were invited to the CollegeInsider.com Tournament where, after a first round bye, they defeated Eastern Michigan in the second round and UTSA in the quarterfinals before losing in the semifinals to Northern Colorado.

Roster 
Sources:

Offseason
Source:

2018–19 recruiting class

Schedule and results
Sources:

|-
!colspan=9 style="background:#; color:#;"| Non-conference regular season

|-
!colspan=9 style="background:#; color:#;"| Southland regular season

|-
!colspan=9 style="background:#;"| Southland tournament

|-
!colspan=9 style="background:#;"| NIT tournament

See also
2018–19 Sam Houston State Bearkats women's basketball team

References

Sam Houston Bearkats men's basketball seasons
Sam Houston State
Sam Houston State Bearkats basketball
Sam Houston State Bearkats basketball
Sam Houston State